Celaya  Fútbol Club Premier was a professional football team that played in the Mexican Football League. They were playing in the Liga Premier Serie B. Celaya Fútbol Club Premier was affiliated with Celaya who plays in the Ascenso MX.

Players

Current squad

References

External links

Football clubs in Guanajuato
Liga Premier de México